This article contains lists of achievements in major senior-level international basketball, 3x3 basketball and wheelchair basketball tournaments according to first-place, second-place and third-place results obtained by teams representing different nations. The objective is not to create combined medal tables; the focus is on listing the best positions achieved by teams in major international tournaments, ranking the nations according to the most number of podiums accomplished by teams of these nations.

Results 
For the making of these lists, results from following major international tournaments were consulted:

 FIBA: International Basketball Federation
 IOC: International Olympic Committee
 IPC: International Paralympic Committee
 IWBF: International Wheelchair Basketball Federation

Medals for the demonstration events are NOT counted. Medals earned by athletes from defunct National Olympic Committees (NOCs) and National Paralympic Committees (NPCs) or historical teams are NOT merged with the results achieved by their immediate successor states. The International Olympic Committee (IOC) and International Paralympic Committee (IPC) do NOT combine medals of these nations or teams.

The tables are pre-sorted by total number of first-place results, second-place results and third-place results, then most first-place results, second-place results, respectively. When equal ranks are given, nations are listed in alphabetical order.

Basketball, 3x3 basketball and wheelchair basketball

Men and women 

*Defunct National Olympic Committees (NOCs) and National Paralympic Committees (NPCs) or historical teams are shown in italic.

Men 

*Defunct National Olympic Committees (NOCs) and National Paralympic Committees (NPCs) or historical teams are shown in italic.

Women 

*Defunct National Olympic Committees (NOCs) and National Paralympic Committees (NPCs) or historical teams are shown in italic.

Basketball and 3x3 basketball

Men and women 

*Defunct National Olympic Committees (NOCs) or historical teams are shown in italic.

Men 

*Defunct National Olympic Committees (NOCs) or historical teams are shown in italic.

Women 

*Defunct National Olympic Committees (NOCs) or historical teams are shown in italic.

Basketball

Men and women 

*Defunct National Olympic Committees (NOCs) or historical teams are shown in italic.

Men 

*Defunct National Olympic Committees (NOCs) or historical teams are shown in italic.

Women 

*Defunct National Olympic Committees (NOCs) or historical teams are shown in italic.

3x3 basketball

Men and women

Men

Women

Wheelchair basketball

Men and women 

*Defunct National Paralympic Committees (NPCs) or historical teams are shown in italic.

Men

Women 

*Defunct National Paralympic Committees (NPCs) or historical teams are shown in italic.

See also 
 FIBA World Rankings
 FIBA Women's World Ranking
 Major achievements in Olympic team ball sports by nation
 List of major achievements in sports by nation

Notes

References

General 
Official results
 Basketball
 Men's Olympic Basketball Tournament: Archive
 Women's Olympic Basketball Tournament: Archive
 FIBA Basketball World Cup: Archive
 FIBA Women's Basketball World Cup: Archive
 Wheelchair basketball
 Wheelchair basketball at the Summer Paralympics: Results
 IWBF Wheelchair Basketball World Championship: Past Results

Specific

External links 
 International Basketball Federation (FIBA)
 International Wheelchair Basketball Federation (IWBF)

Basketball
Achievements
Achievements